A lug nut or wheel nut is a fastener, specifically a nut, used to secure a wheel on a vehicle.  Typically, lug nuts are found on automobiles, trucks (lorries), and other large vehicles using rubber tires.

Design
A lug nut is a nut fastener with one rounded or conical (tapered) end, used on steel and most aluminum wheels. A set of lug nuts is typically used to secure a wheel to threaded wheel studs and thereby to a vehicle's axles.
Some designs (Audi, BMW, Mercedes-Benz, Saab, Volkswagen) use lug bolts or wheel bolts instead of nuts, which screw into a tapped (threaded) hole in the wheel's hub or brake drum or brake disc.

The conical lug's taper is normally 60 degrees (although 45 degrees is common for wheels designed for racing applications), and is designed to help center the wheel accurately on the axle, and to reduce the tendency for the nut to loosen due to fretting induced precession, as the car is driven. One popular alternative to the conical lug seating design is the rounded, hemispherical, or ball seat. Automotive manufacturers such as Audi, BMW, and Honda use this design rather than a tapered seat, but the nut performs the same function. Older style (non-ferrous) alloy wheels use nuts with a  cylindrical shank slipping into the wheel to center it and a washer that applies pressure to clamp the wheel to the axle.

Wheel lug nuts may have different shapes. Aftermarket alloy and forged wheels often require specific lug nuts to match their mounting holes, so it is often necessary to get a new set of lug nuts when the wheels are changed.

There are four common lug nut types:

 cone seat
 bulge cone seat
 under hub cap
 spline drive.

The lug nut thread type varies between car brands and models. Examples of commonly used metric threads include:

 M10×1.25 mm
 M12 (1.25, 1.5 or 1.75 mm thread pitch, with M12x1.5 mm being the most common)
 M14 (1.25, 1.5 or 2 mm pitch, with M14×1.5 mm being the most common)
 M16×1.5 mm

Some older American cars use inch threads, for example ″-20 (11.1 mm), ″-20 (12.7 mm), or ″-20 (14.3 mm).

Removal and installation

Lug nuts may be removed using a lug, socket, or impact wrench.  If the wheel is to be removed, an automotive jack to raise the vehicle and some wheel chocks would be used as well.  Wheels that have hubcaps or wheel covers need these removed beforehand, typically with a screwdriver, flatbar, or prybar. Lug nuts can be difficult to remove, as they may become frozen to the wheel stud. In such cases a breaker bar or repeated blows from an impact wrench can be used to free them. Alternating between tightening and loosening can free especially stubborn lug nuts. The best approach to tighten/ loosening lug nuts is to use a torque wrench. A torque wrench is a very beneficial tool that you should consider buying. It will allow you to tighten/ loosening lug nuts easily, because it saves time and effort, professional technicians also utilize a torque wrench to tighten/ loosening lug nuts.

Lug nuts must be installed in an alternating pattern, commonly referred to as a star pattern. This ensures a uniform distribution of load across the wheel mounting surface. When installing lug nuts, it is recommended to tighten them with a calibrated torque wrench. While a lug, socket, or impact wrench may be used to tighten lug nuts, the final tightening should be performed by a torque wrench, ensuring an accurate and adequate load is applied. Torque specifications vary by vehicle and wheel type. Both vehicle and wheel manufacturers provide recommended torque values which should be consulted when an installation is done. Failure to abide by the recommended torque value can result in damage to the wheel and brake rotor/drum. Additionally, under-tightened lug nuts may come loose with time.

The tool size needed for removal and installation depends on the type of lug nut. The three most common hex sizes for lug nuts are 17 mm, 19 mm, and 21 mm, while 22 mm, 23 mm,  inch (17.5 mm), and  inch (20.6 mm) are less commonly used.

Detecting loose nuts
In order to allow early detection of loose lug nuts, some large vehicles are fitted with loose wheel nut indicators.  The indicator spins with the nut so that loosening can be detected with a visual inspection.

Anti-theft nuts or bolts

In countries where the theft of alloy wheels is a serious problem, locking nuts (or bolts, as applicable) are available - or already fitted by the vehicle manufacturer - which require a special adaptor ("key") between the nut and the wrench to fit and remove.  The key is normally unique to each set of nuts.  Only one locking nut per wheel is normally used, so they are sold in sets of four.  Most designs can be defeated using a hardened removal tool which uses a left-hand self-cutting thread to grip the locking nut, although more advanced designs have a spinning outer ring to frustrate such techniques. An older technique for removal was to simply hammer a slightly smaller socket over the locking wheel nut to be able to remove it. However, with the newer design of locking wheel nuts this is no longer possible. Removal nowadays requires special equipment that is not available to the general public. This helps to prevent thieves from obtaining the tools to be able to remove the lock nuts themselves.

History

In the United States, vehicles manufactured prior to 1975 by the Chrysler Corporation used left-hand and right-hand screw thread for different sides of the vehicle to prevent loosening.  Most Buicks, Pontiacs, and Oldsmobiles used both left-handed and right-handed lug nuts prior to model year 1965.  It was later realized that the taper seat performed the same function.  Most modern vehicles use right-hand threads on all wheels.

See also 
 Center cap
 Wheel sizing

References

External links 
 
 

Nuts (hardware)
Vehicle parts